Kelso is a surname and a given name. It is of British origin with Scottish  and English roots.

People with the surname
 Ben Kelso (born 1949), American basketball player and coach
 Beverley Kelso (born 1948), Jamaican singer
 Bill Kelso (1940-2009), Major League Baseball pitcher
 Bob Kelso (footballer) (1865-1942), Scottish soccer player
 Frank B. Kelso II (born 1933), United States Navy admiral
 Iris Kelso (1926-2003), American journalist and television commentator
 J. A. Scott Kelso (born 1947), neuroscientist
 J. J. Kelso (1864-1935), creator of the Children's Aid Society in Canada
 Jack W. Kelso (1934-1952), Medal of Honor recipient
 Jackie Kelso (1922-2012), American jazz saxophonist, flautist, and clarinetist
 James Kelso (footballer) (1869-1900), Scottish footballer
 Jamie Kelso (born 1948), American political activist and supremacist
 Jim Kelso (1910-1987), Scottish soccer player
 Jimmy Kelso (1910-?), Australian boxer of the 1920s and '30s 
 John R. Kelso (1831-1891), politician and author
 Iain Kelso (born 1975), Canadian film score composer
 Lee Kelso, television news anchor
 Louis O. Kelso (1913-1991), political economist
 Mark Kelso (born 1963), former Buffalo Bills defensive back
 Mayme Kelso (1867-1946), American actress
 Megan Kelso (born 1968), comic book artist
 Phil Kelso (1871-1935), Scottish soccer player
 Sylvia Kelso, Australian author
 Tommy Kelso (1882-1974), Scottish footballer
 Thomas Kelso (1784-1878), philanthropist
 William Kelso (born 1941), archeologist

People with the given name
 Kelso Roberts, Canadian politician
 Kelso Cochrane (~1936-1959), Antiguan immigrant to Britain whose murder sparked tensions in London

Fictional characters
 Bob Kelso, Chief of Medicine from Scrubs
 Michael Kelso, character on That '70s Show
 Casey Kelso, That '70s Show character
 Wyoming Bill Kelso, character in The Party
 Jack Kelso, character in L.A. Noire
 Capt. Wild Bill Kelso in 1941
 Zeke Kelso, FBI Agent in That Darn Cat! and That Darn Cat (1997 film)

See also
Kelso (disambiguation)

References

Scottish toponymic surnames